Mitsutoshi (written: 充寿, 光年 or 三敏) is a masculine Japanese given name. Notable people with the name include:

, Japanese manga artist
 (born 1975), Japanese manga artist
, Japanese footballer
 (born 1976), Japanese footballer

Japanese masculine given names